The 2012 Moselle Open was a men's tennis tournament played on indoor hard courts. It was the tenth edition of the Moselle Open, and part of the ATP World Tour 250 series of the 2012 ATP World Tour. It was held at the Parc des Expositions de Metz Métropole in Metz, France, from 17 September to 23 September 2012. Jo-Wilfried Tsonga won the singles title. First-seeded Jo-Wilfried Tsonga won the singles title.

Singles main-draw entrants

Seeds

 1 Rankings are as of September 10, 2012.

Other entrants
The following players received wild cards into the singles main draw:
  Nikolay Davydenko
  Paul-Henri Mathieu
  Albano Olivetti
The following players received entry from the singles qualifying draw:
  Kenny de Schepper
  Vincent Millot
  Clément Reix
  Mischa Zverev
The following players received entry as lucky losers:
  Michael Berrer
  Daniel Brands

Withdrawals
  Benjamin Becker
  Jarkko Nieminen (right thigh injury)

Retirements
  Marcel Granollers (intercostal muscle pain) 
  Jan Hájek (right wrist injury)

Doubles main-draw entrants

Seeds

 Rankings are as of September 10, 2012

Other entrants
The following pairs received wildcards into the doubles main draw:
  Pierre-Hugues Herbert /  Albano Olivetti
  Vincent Millot /  Gaël Monfils

Retirements
  Vincent Millot (foot injury)

Finals

Singles

 Jo-Wilfried Tsonga defeated  Andreas Seppi, 6–1, 6–2

Doubles

 Nicolas Mahut /  Édouard Roger-Vasselin defeated  Johan Brunström /  Frederik Nielsen, 7–6(3), 6–4

References

External links
Official website